Summa Health is a nonprofit integrated healthcare delivery system in Northeast Ohio, United States. The Greater Akron Chamber (Ohio)  documents Summa Health as the largest employer in Summit County with more than 7,000 employees. Summa provides comprehensive emergency, acute, critical, outpatient and long-term/home care.

Summa Health's integrated healthcare system, encompasses a network of hospitals, multiple community-based health centers, a health plan (Summa Care), a multi-specialty group practice, an accountable care organization (ACO - New Health Collaborative), research and medical education and a foundation.

Outpatient care is offered throughout Summit, Stark, Wayne, Portage, and Medina counties in several community health centers. The healthcare system provides patient care, medical research, and continuing medical education, and is ranked a top healthcare provider in the region.

History 

Summa Health System was formed in 1989 when Akron City Hospital and St. Thomas Hospital merged. Summa Health now encompasses a network of hospitals, community-based health centers, a health plan, a physician-hospital organization, an entrepreneurial entity, research, and medical education and a foundation.

More than 1,300 licensed, inpatient beds are represented on the Summa Health Akron Campus, Summa Health St. Thomas Campus, Summa Health Rehab Hospital, and  Summa Health Barberton Campus.

Outpatient care is offered in multiple community health centers and through partnerships with the YMCA.

Services 
Summa Health System specializes in advanced bariatric care, behavioral health, cancer care, cardiovascular, neurosciences, orthopedics, primary care, senior health, sports health, surgical services, urology and women’s health.

The Jean B. and Milton N. Cooper Pavilion on the Summa Akron Campus provides outpatient cancer services. The 60,000-square-foot facility includes physician and support staff offices; a conference center; and cancer-related services, including 28 infusion treatment areas, three radiation oncology treatment areas, diagnostic imaging, clinical research, rehabilitation services and educational and support services; and access to psychologists and physical therapists.

The Summa Wellness Institute is a 65,000-square-foot (6,000 m2) medical-based fitness facility in Hudson, Ohio. The institute integrates fitness amenities and medical technology. Exercise physiologists create personalized fitness programs and health goals for each member after the completion of a thorough health assessment.

Locations and facilities 
Summa Health System represents more than 1,300 licensed beds in the following clinical settings:
 Summa Akron Campus
 Summa Barberton Campus
 Summa St. Thomas Campus (no Emergency Department)
 Summa Health Wadsworth-Rittman Medical Center
 Summa Health Medina Medical Center
 Summa Health Green Medical Center
 Summa Health Tallmadge Medical Center
 Summa Health Chapel Hill Medical Center
 Summa Health Equity Center at Four Seasons
 Summa Health Cuyahoga Falls Medical Center
 Summa Health Hudson Medical Center
 Summa Health Spine and Neuroscience Center
 Summa Health Stow-Kent Medical Center
 Summa Health White Pond Medical Center
 Summa Health Wellness Center
 Summa Health at Wadsworth Community Center
 Summa Rehab Hospital
 Summa Health Fairlawn Urgent Care
 Summa Health Green Urgent Care
 Summa Health Tallmadge Urgent Care

Outpatient care is provided to the Ohio counties of Summit, Portage, Medina, Stark and Wayne.

References

External links 
 http://www.summahealth.org

Hospital networks in the United States
Medical and health organizations based in Ohio